Ritus Krjauklis (born 23 April 1986) is a Latvian footballer who currently plays for Latvian Higher League club Daugavpils as a centre back.

Club career
As a child and teenager, Ritus Krjauklis played for his local club FK Ilūkste under coach Vladimirs Vinokurovs from 1993 till 2002. In 2002, he moved to Daugavpils and continued playing for Dinaburg Daugavpils youth team. In 2005 Krjauklis was taken to the first team by Tamaz Pertia. In 2006 Krjauklis was signed by FK Ventspils but he couldn't prove his abilities there so he had to move back to Daugavpils just one year later. He spent the next 3 seasons there, from 2007 to 2009 respectively, and managed to become a vital player at the club, playing 77 matches and scoring 6 goals during those 3 seasons.

In 2009, after Dinaburg Daugavpils were excluded from the Latvian Higher League because of suspect about betting against their own results, Krjauklis was set free. Then he joined FK Ventspils again. This time he became a starting eleven player and played 25 matches in the 2010 season. After that season Krjauklis accepted an offer from Azerbaijan and signed a two-year contract with the Azerbaijan Premier League club AZAL PFC. His start there was bright as he played in the starting elven but then, after just 10 matches, in August 2011 he was released. Krjauklis returned home and after a few days was signed by the Latvian Higher League club Liepājas Metalurgs. Until the end of the season he participated in 10 league matches and also managed to score once.

On 15 July 2012, he moved to the South African Premier Soccer League club Golden Arrows. Krjauklis was released from his contract after a single season at Golden Arrows and joined fellow Premier Soccer League club Ajax Cape Town in August 2013. Prior to the 2014 Latvian Higher League season he returned to Latvia, joining FK Spartaks Jūrmala. At the end of January 2015 Krjauklis moved to the defending Latvian champions FK Ventspils.

On 25 February 2019, Krjauklis transferred to the China League One side Xinjiang Tianshan Leopard.

Career statistics

Club

International career
Ritus Krjauklis made his debut for Latvia in a friendly match against Bulgaria on 12 August 2009. As of 2012, he has been capped 18 times, scoring no goals. He received regular call-ups under the management of Aleksandrs Starkovs till 2012, but since the appointment of Marians Pahars in 2013 Krjauklis has not been called up to the team. As of February 2015, he has played 22 international matches for Latvia, scoring no goals.

Honours

FK Ventspils
 Latvian champion
 2006
 Baltic League winner
 2010

National team
 Baltic Cup winner
 2012

References

External links
 
 
 

1986 births
Living people
People from Ilūkste
Latvian footballers
Latvia international footballers
Dinaburg FC players
Latvian expatriate footballers
Latvian expatriate sportspeople in Azerbaijan
Latvian expatriate sportspeople in China
Expatriate footballers in Azerbaijan
Expatriate footballers in China
AZAL PFK players
Expatriate soccer players in South Africa
FK Ventspils players
FK Liepājas Metalurgs players
Lamontville Golden Arrows F.C. players
Cape Town Spurs F.C. players
FK Spartaks Jūrmala players
FK RFS players
Association football defenders
Ilūkstes NSS players
Xinjiang Tianshan Leopard F.C. players
Nanjing City F.C. players
BFC Daugavpils players
China League One players